Tanja Hauschildt (born 28 December 1972) is a German former professional tennis player.

On 24 February 1992, Gustmane reached her best singles ranking of world number 207. On 22 March 1993, she peaked at world number 208 in the doubles rankings. Her only WTA Tour main-draw appearance came at the 1991 Croatian Lottery Cup Hauschildt, where she came through qualifying to make the main draw. She defeated by Austrian Sandra Dopferin the first round she was defeated by  in straight sets.

ITF finals

Singles (0–1)

Doubles (2–1)

References

External links
 
 

1972 births
Living people
West German female tennis players
German female tennis players